Thomas Ritchie  (November 5, 1778 – July 3, 1854) of Virginia was a leading American newspaper journalist, editor and publisher.

Biography
He read law and medicine, but, instead of practicing either, set up a bookstore in Richmond, Virginia in 1803. He bought out the Republican newspaper the Richmond Enquirer in 1804, and made it a financial and political success, as editor and publisher for 41 years.  The paper appeared three times a week.  Thomas Jefferson said of the Enquirer: "I read but a single newspaper, Ritchie's Enquirer, the best that is published or ever has been published in America."  Ritchie wrote the stirring partisan editorials, clipped the news from Washington and New York papers, and did most of the local reporting himself.  For 25 years he was state printer, a method by which his political friends subsidized their most articulate voice.

Ritchie was a leader of the "Richmond Junto" that controlled the Republican state committee, originally with Ritchie's relatives Spencer Roane and Dr. John Brockenbrough of the Virginia State Bank. Richmond was a violent frontier town when Ritchie arrived. Controversial rival journalist and Jefferson opponent James T. Callender was found drowned in three feet of water in 1803. Nonetheless, Ritchie set up a press and began advocating restrictions on free blacks as well as slave manumissions. Lawyer and Richmond Enquirer founding editor Meriwether Jones died in a duel on August 3, 1806. John Daly Burk and Skelton Jones (Meriwether's brother) also both died in duels before completing a projected four volume history of Richmond. Ritchie editorialized against South Carolina and Georgia reopening the transatlantic slave trade, and later for U.S. intervention in the War of 1812. Political rivals also could find themselves excoriated in the press, and even President James Monroe was not immune. A faction of the Democratic-Republican party, once nicknamed the quids and thought more radical than Jefferson, grew increasingly pro-slavery, anti-foreigner and anti-Catholic over time. Committed to democratic reform in representation of the western counties and full manhood suffrage (for whites), Ritchie promoted the 1829 Virginia state constitutional convention.  A modernizer, Ritchie came to promote public schools and extensive state internal improvements.

In national politics, Ritchie's influence rested first on an alliance with New York Senator Martin Van Buren. They both promoted William H. Crawford's presidential candidacy in 1824, and next that of Andrew Jackson in 1828. Ritchie favored the "Old Republican" "principles of '98, '99" against what he considered the corrupting influence of Henry Clay and the divisive tactics of John C. Calhoun, whose nullification and Southern-party policies Ritchie detested. Late in his life, Ritchie denounced abolitionists but supported gradual emancipation.

In the 1844 US presidential election, Ritchie supported James K. Polk because of Polk's support for the annexation of Texas.  Polk brought Ritchie to Washington to edit the national paper The Union (1845 to 1851). Ritchie supported the Compromise of 1850, but the new paper never was as influential as the Enquirer. Meanwhile, Ritchie had lost his Virginia base, as his son and namesake took over the Richmond Enquirer. In 1846, Thomas Ritchie Jr. killed Richmond Whig founder and editor John Hampden Pleasants in a duel.

See also
 Charles Henry Ambler – Preeminent Virginia & West Virginia historian, and Thomas Ritchie biographer
 History of Virginia
 History of West Virginia

References

 Charles H. Ambler, Thomas Ritchie: A Study in Virginia Politics (1913)
 Pearson, C. C. "Ritchie, Thomas" in Dictionary of American Biography, Volume 8 (1935)

Journalists from Virginia
Writers from Richmond, Virginia
1778 births
1854 deaths
19th-century American journalists
19th-century American male writers
American male journalists
American duellists